Markus Werner (27 December 1944 – 3 July 2016) was a Swiss writer, known as the author of the novels Zündels Abgang (Zündel’s Exit), Am Hang (On the Edge), and Die kalte Schulter (Cold Shoulder).

Life
Markus Werner was born in Eschlikon, in the canton of Thurgau. In 1948 the family moved to  Thayngen (canton of Schaffhausen) where Werner finished school and passed the general qualification for university entrance in 1965. At the university of Zürich he studied German, philosophy and psychology.  In 1974 he completed a doctorate on Max Frisch, whose writing has been an important influence on Werner. From 1975 to 1985, he worked as a teacher, and from 1985 to 1990 as an assistant professor at the Kantonsschule (high school) in Schaffhausen. He dedicated himself exclusively to writing after 1990. In 2002, he was elected member of the Deutsche Akademie für Sprache und Dichtung in Darmstadt. Werner lived in Schaffhausen until his death in 2016.

Performances
The protagonists of Werner's novels have quit their jobs. From their perspectives Werner laconically describes everyday life, at turns astonished, with distress, and with humour.
The results are  strictly calculated scenes and episodes in which the course of the world appears in too sharp and sometimes laughable details, situations that Werner's protagonists simply cannot deal with. Seemingly harmless everyday perfidies break down Werner's characters: the deaf ears of their fellow men, their cold, headstrong souls. Human deficiencies are described in a tragicomical way. Werner sees the self-evident as something strange, is astonished and wonders like a child. His protagonists want the right to make mistakes and have deficiencies
(“self-assuredness is the sign of the yokel”, in: Die kalte Schulter, a Chinese saying).
They crave love, but at the same time curse the world and themselves.

Awards 
 1984 Prize of the Jürgen Ponto Foundation
 1984 and 1993 singular work award of the Swiss Schiller Foundation
 1986 Georg Fischer Prize of the city Schaffhausen
 1990 Alemannic Literature Prize
 1993 Thomas Valentin Literature Prize
 1995 Prix littéraire Lipp; International Bodensee Literature Prize
 1997 Preis der SWR-Bestenliste
 1999 Hermann-Hesse-Literaturpreis
 2000 Joseph Breitbach Prize (jointly with Ilse Aichinger and W. G. Sebald)
 2002 Johann Peter Hebel Prize of Baden-Württemberg
 2005 Life achievement Award of the Swiss Schiller Foundation 
 2006 Bodensee Literature Prize

Works 
 Bilder des Endgültigen, Entwürfe des Möglichen. Zum Werk Max Frischs, Univ. Diss. 1974 (literally: “Pictures of the definitive. Drafts of the possible. About Max Frisch’s work”)
 Zündels Abgang, novel, 1984,  (Zündel’s Departure)
 Froschnacht, novel, 1985,  (literally: "Frog night“)
 Die kalte Schulter, novel, 1989,  (literally: "The cold shoulder“)
 Bis bald, novel, 1992,  (2005/2006 in the book series Schweizer Bibliothek) (literally: "Till soon“)
 Festland, novel, 1996,  (literally: "Mainland“)
 Der ägyptische Heinrich, novel, 1999,  (literally: "The Egyptian Heinrich“)
 Am Hang, novel, 2004, translated into English by Robert E. Goodwin as On the Edge, 2013,

Works in translation 
 Zündel's Exit, trans. Michael Hoffman. Dalkey Archive Press: 2013. 
 On the Edge, trans. Robert E. Goodwin. NYRB: 2014. 
 Cold Shoulder, trans. Michael Hoffman. Dalkey Archive Press: 2016.

Literature 
 Allein das Zögern ist human. About Markus Werner’s works. Editor: Martin Ebel. Frankfurt am Main, 2006  (Fischer Taschenbuch 16908), . contains unpublished texts of Markus Werner.

References

External links 
 

                   

1944 births
2016 deaths
People from Münchwilen District
People from Schaffhausen
Swiss writers in German
20th-century Swiss novelists